Nude on the Moon is a 1961 science-fantasy nudist film co-written and co-directed by Doris Wishman and Raymond Phelan under the shared pseudonyms "O. O. Miller" and "Anthony Brooks". The film was produced in 1960 and theatrically released in 1961.

Nude on the Moon is the second of eight nudist films produced and directed by Wishman. While most nudist films of the time were set within a conventional nudist camp, apparently as a promotional gimmick Wishman decided to set the story in a nudist civilization on the Moon.

Plot
Scientist Dr. Jeff Huntley inherits a fortune of US$3 million (equivalent to $ million in ) from his uncle and invests it in the development of a rocket ship, built with the assistance of his mentor, Dr. Nichols.

After landing on the Moon, the pair discover a civilization of topless extraterrestrials led by a Moon Queen with telepathic powers.

Enamored of Dr. Huntley, the Moon Queen allows the men to take photos of the nudists during their everyday activities.

Their oxygen running low, the two are forced to return to Earth, realizing in the process that they've left their camera behind and have no proof of the aliens' existence.

Jeff is dispirited to learn that nobody believes their trip succeeded, but his spirits are lifted when he sees the resemblance between Dr. Nichols's secretary, Cathy, and the Moon Queen.

The movie ends as the two embrace, signaling the beginning of a new romance.

Soundtrack
Nude on the Moon features the original song "I'm Mooning Over You (My Little Moon Doll)" sung by Ralph Young (who also plays a principal role in Wishman's Blaze Starr Goes Nudist under the pseudonym "Russ Martine"). Young would soon meet Belgian singer Tony Sandler and form Sandler and Young, a successful easy-listening duo, with him. The lyrics and melody were written by Wishman's niece, Judith Kushner. According to Wishman, future Tonight Show bandleader Doc Severinsen arranged the orchestration but is not credited.

Production
The Moon sequences in the film were shot at Coral Castle in Homestead, Florida.

Reception
In a review for AllMovie, Fred Beldin wrote:

Legacy
Nude on the Moon is considered a cult film.

References to the film in pop culture include:

 Nude on the Moon: The B-52's Anthology, a two-disc CD anthology of music by The B-52's, was released on Rhino Records. Lead singer Fred Schneider was a friend of Wishman's in her later years.
 "Nude on the Moon" (1996), a single by electronica duo Tipsy, also appears on the album Trip Tease. One of the remixes is called the "naked volleyball mix".

See also
 List of American films of 1961
List of films featuring extraterrestrials
Nudity in film

References

Bibliography

External links

1961 films
1960s erotic films
1960s science fiction films
American science fiction films
1960s English-language films
Films about astronauts
Films directed by Doris Wishman
Films set in Coral Gables, Florida
Films shot in Florida
Moon in film
American sexploitation films
Nudity in film
1960s American films